Lemberg (Affalterbach) is a hill, 365 metres high, in Baden-Württemberg, Germany.

Mountains and hills of Baden-Württemberg